The Hotel Metropole was the first hotel in New York City that had running water in every room. Located in Manhattan at 147 West 43rd Street just off Times Square, the hotel, now known as the Casablanca Hotel Times Square, had a list of notable residents including Nick Arnstein and Western lawman-turned-sports writer Bat Masterson.

In the early morning hours of July 16, 1912, the hotel was the site of the murder of Herman Rosenthal. Rosenthal was the owner of several New York gambling dens. This murder was allegedly at the behest of Charles Becker, a New York police detective who was executed in 1915 for that murder. James Thurber wrote an article about this called "Two O'Clock at the Metropole".

The Metropole's reputation for attracting gamblers is referenced in F. Scott Fitzgerald's 1925 novel The Great Gatsby. It appears in the dialogue as the location of a restaurant favored by Meyer Wolfsheim.

The Hotel Metropole later became the Hotel Rosoff and is now the Casablanca Hotel.

See also
List of former hotels in Manhattan
Metropole Cafe

References

External links

Midtown Manhattan
Defunct hotels in Manhattan
Times Square buildings